The Malaysian Friendship and Trade Centre is the representative office of Malaysia in Taiwan in the absence of diplomatic relations.

In 1974, Malaysia established diplomatic relations with the People's Republic of China, leading to the closure of the Malaysian Consulate-General in Taipei.  An office of Malaysia Airlines in Taipei represented Malaysia's interests in Taiwan until 1982. In 1983, a Trade Office was opened, leading to the establishment of the Friendship and Trade Exchange Centre, before it adopted its present name in 1987. 

Its counterpart body in Malaysia is the Taipei Economic and Cultural Office in Malaysia in Kuala Lumpur.

See also
 Malaysia–Taiwan relations 
 List of diplomatic missions in Taiwan
 List of diplomatic missions of Malaysia

References

Representative Offices in Taipei
Taipei
Malaysia–Taiwan relations